Aralia leschenaultii is a species of plant in the family Araliaceae. It is found in China, India, Myanmar, and Sri Lanka.

References

leschenaultii
Flora of China
Flora of the Indian subcontinent
Flora of Myanmar
Taxonomy articles created by Polbot
Taxobox binomials not recognized by IUCN